Yu Zheng (born 28 February 1978) is a Chinese screenwriter and producer who is noted for Palace, which earned him a Best Screenwriter award at the 16th Asian Television Awards.

Biography

Early life
Yu was born and raised in Haining, Zhejiang, after high school, he moved to Shanghai, he became an auditor at Shanghai Theatre Academy.

Career
In August 1998, Yu signed with TVB. One year later, he signed with Li Huimin Studio. In July 2003, Yu transferred to Taiwan Star International Entertainment Company, he also founded his company, Yu Zheng Studio. In June 2009, Yu founded the Quansheng Time Film and Television Company.

Controversies

Authorship controversy
In December 2004, many news media reported that Yu Zheng—then a total unknown—was threatening to sue director Raymond Lee and the production company for the drama Assassinator Jing Ke, because his name did not appear in the credits under either "story by" or "writer(s)". Lee did not respond, but writer Wang Qiuyu published a long blog entry demanding Yu's apology, adding "Finally some sincere advices to Yu Zheng, a creator is not a businessman. Spend more time creating, less energy on gaining exposures." At the end Yu never followed up on his legal threats.

Discussing this incident in 2014, Lee said, "Yu Zheng is very smart, he knows how to make himself known."

Veiled attacks against rivals
In 2010, actress Ruby Lin who starred in the Yu Zheng production Beauty's Rival in Palace, refused to star in Yu Zheng's next project Beauty World, choosing to become a producer herself instead. Subsequently, many fellow actors from Beauty's Rival in Palace chose to join Lin's debut project The Glamorous Imperial Concubine over Beauty World. On December 12, Yu posted a message on his Sina Weibo account insinuating  "someone" as "shanzhaiing" his production. Lin responded by writing "so-called friend has lost even the most basic respect... really disappointed." Yu then denied he was referring to Lin, saying that he wished to collaborate with Lin again, adding "Why would Ruby be agitated?" Later, after Lin kept her silence, he continued his veiled attacks, writing on Sina Weibo: "What are the benefits for an actress to become a producer?... Correct answer is, for a chance to make out with all the young, hot guys!"

On October 30, 2012, Yu Zheng wrote on his Sina Weibo microblog alleging that a "certain director" fired an actress because she refused his sexual advances. On November 6, television director and producer Xi Xin made a public statement accusing Yu Zheng of defamation. Since Yu refused to apologize, Xi filed a lawsuit claim. A year later in November 2013, Beijing First Intermediate People's Court ruled in Xi's favor.

Battery case
On March 18, 2013, Yu Zheng was physically beaten by a man, later identified as actor Shen Tai, in a coffee shop. Shen served 3 days in detention but refused to apologize. Yu claimed he was beaten because he refused Shen's demands of a role in his drama. Shen called it a lie, and wrote the following on his Sina Weibo microblog: "Everybody has a bottom line. I can just say that knowing such a person can only be described as disgusting. If he does stupid things again I will slap him just the same."

Plagiarism allegations

Lawsuit with Chiung Yao
On April 2, 2014, a newspaper quoted actress Shirley Dai as claiming that the Yu Zheng TV drama she participated in, Palace 3: The Lost Daughter, was actually based on Taiwanese writer Chiung Yao's 1992 novel Plum Blossom Scar. Yu Zheng then unleashed a rant on his Sina Weibo microblog calling "a certain actress" an attention whore.

Shortly after the drama aired in China on April 7, Chiung Yao released an open letter to China's State Administration of Press, Publication, Radio, Film and Television on April 15 accusing Yu Zheng of blatant plagiarism "unprecedented and beyond my endurance," seeking the immediate suspension of the broadcast of the TV series. Yu denied the claim, saying he was a fan of Chiung Yao with no intention of angering her. On April 28, a team led by Wang Jun from Beijing-based Yingke Law Firm filed a plagiarism lawsuit against Yu.

On April 17, novelist Meiyuzhe claimed that Palace 3: The Lost Daughter not only plagiarized Chiung Yao's work but also stole an important part from her novel The Imperial Enterprise. She claimed that it was not the first time Yu Zheng plagiarized from her novels.

On July 14, Yu Zheng's objections to the jurisdiction of the Chiung Yao lawsuit were denied by Beijing Third Intermediate People's Court.

On December 25, 2014, the court ruled in Chiung Yao's favor, ordering 4 companies to stop distributing and broadcasting The Palace: The Lost Daughter, also demanding Yu Zheng to publicly apologize, and pay Chiung Yao ¥5 million (around $800,000). China Radio International called it a "landmark ruling".

On December 5, Beijing Third Intermediate People's Court convened the case. Wang Hailin, executive director of Chinese Television Series Screenwriter Association, testified as expert witness for Chiung Yao's camp.

On December 12, 109 Chinese screenwriters published a joint statement supporting Chiung Yao's lawsuit against Yu Zheng. A day later, an additional 30 Chinese screenwriters made their support of Chiung Yao known.

Other plagiarism
Yu's 2006 drama Concubines of the Qing Emperor had been suspected of plagiarizing the Hong Kong drama War and Beauty (2004). Yu denied it, but stated that his drama "contained the successful parts of classic dramas like War and Beauty, Dae Jang Geum, and Winter Sonata".

Yu's 2011 hit drama, Palace was allegedly a plagiarism of several well-known television series/novels, including Tong Hua's Bu Bu Jing Xin as well as the Taiwanese hit series Meteor Garden. On June 3, 2014, writer Tong Hua accused Yu of not only consistently "consulting" her work but also telling the public that others were plagiarizing him. Tong Hua threatened legal actions if Yu continued his false claims.

Writers Fu Xing and He Zizhuang have claimed that in 2003, Yu Zheng and Fu Xing co-wrote a script for the drama Take Me to Fly, Take Me for a Walk. Whereas Fu came up with all the characters and relationships, Yu claimed all the credits when he published the script as a book. Yu later wrote an apology letter to Fu, who forgave him. Yu also offered to compensate Fu ¥30,000 but never did.

On May 6, writer Li Yaling, who co-wrote 2 Yu Zheng dramas Pretty Maid (2010) and Spell of the Fragrance (2010), offered to be a witness to support Chiung Yao's lawsuit. She claimed that back in 2008 Yu had asked her to "borrow" Plum Blossom Scar'''s story for a new script, but she refused. Li Yaling further claimed that Yu had copied scenes from the Singaporean drama The Little Nyonya (2009) for Pretty Maid, an action that also damaged her reputation because she was listed as the writer. She also claimed that Yu Zheng once told her that as long as plagiarism does not exceed 20% then the courts would have no case. Another writer Zou Yue also claimed to have heard the "20% rule" from Yu Zheng.

On March 12, 2015, Yangzhou Intermediate People's Court accepted a plagiarism lawsuit filed by author Zhou Haohui against Yu Zheng and others, for allegedly plagiarizing from his novel The Evil Hypnotist for their 2014 TV series Cosmetology High.

On December 21, 2020, Yu Zheng and Guo Jingming were highlighted in a joint letter signed by 111 Chinese film and television industry insiders. The joint letter called for immediately stop the publicity and hype of the two who have plagiarism and bad traces, and revise and adjust the related variety shows they are currently participating in. On December 31, 2020, Yu Zheng and Guo Jingming issued their own individual apology through their respective Weibo accounts. Yu made a long-issued court-ordered apology for plagiarizing Chiung Yao's 1993 novel Plum Blossom Mark in his TV drama Palace 3: The Lost Daughter broadcast in 2014. Following his apology, Yu's appearances as a judge in the third episode of the third season of variety show I am the Actor'' have been removed.

Filmography

Film

Television series

Web series

Yu Zheng Studio (Huanyu Film)

Male artists
Nie Yuan
Xu Kai
Song Weilong
Merxat
Zhao Yiqin
Zhang Yijie
Sun Ao
Hong Yao
He Fengtian
Wang Maolei
Wang Yizhe
Wang Yuwei

Female artists
Ning Jing
Wu Jiayi
Bai Lu
Wu Jinyan 
Yang Rong
Liu Min
Zhang Nan
Gao Yu'er
Zhang Zexi

Former artists
Mickey He 
Yuan Shanshan
Chen Xiao
Zhang Zhehan
Jin Shijia

Awards

References

External links
 
  Yu Zheng

1978 births
Writers from Jiaxing
Shanghai Theatre Academy alumni
Living people
Chinese television producers
Screenwriters from Zhejiang
Chinese lyricists
Musicians from Zhejiang